Leading Aircraftman Karl Mander Gravell, GC (27 September 1922 – 10 November 1941) was posthumously awarded the George Cross, the highest British (and Commonwealth) award for bravery out of combat. The decoration was awarded for the heroism he showed on 10 November 1941 in Calgary, Alberta.
 
LAC Gravell was on a training flight when the Tiger Moth aircraft he was flying in suffered mechanical failure and crashed in flames. Gravell managed to get clear but despite his serious injuries - he had lost an eye and was badly burned - he dived back into the inferno with his own clothes still on fire in a vain effort to rescue the pilot. He was pulled from the wreckage but later died from his grievous burns.

Born in Sweden in 1922, he moved to Canada with his family in 1937 and became a naturalized Canadian citizen in July of that year. The aspiring air gunner had joined the Royal Canadian Air Force on 15 March 1941 from his adopted home town of Vancouver, British Columbia. After completing his depot training, he had been posted to No. 2 Wireless School in Calgary.

The following citation was published in The London Gazette on 11 June 1942:

"In November, 1941, a training aircraft crashed and immediately burst into flames. Leading Aircraftman Gravell, who was under training as a wireless air gunner, managed to extricate himself from the wreckage and get clear. In spite of the intense shock caused by the loss of one eye and severe burns, suffered at the time of the crash, Leading Aircraftman Gravell's first and only thought was for the welfare of his pilot. The pilot was still in the aircraft and Gravell ignoring his own serious injuries and the fact that his clothes were ablaze attempted to get back to the flaming wreckage to pull him clear. He had barely reached the aircraft when he was dragged away and rolled on the ground to extinguish the flames which had, by this time, completely enveloped his clothing. Leading Aircraftman Gravell subsequently died from his burns. Had he not considered his pilot before his own safety and had he immediately proceeded to extinguish the flames on his own clothing, he would probably not have lost his life."

LAC Gravell is buried in Mountain View Cemetery, Vancouver. A monument to the bravery of Gravell and the schoolteacher, Mrs. Frances Walsh, who pulled him from the wreckage, stands near the site of the crash, on the north-east corner of the intersection of Range Road 25 and Big Hill Springs Road east of Airdrie. Mrs. Walsh was awarded the George Medal for her heroism.

See also
List of George Cross recipients

References

1922 births
1941 deaths
Accidental deaths in Alberta
Canadian military personnel killed in World War II
Canadian recipients of the George Cross
People from Norrköping
Royal Canadian Air Force airmen
Royal Canadian Air Force personnel of World War II
Victims of aviation accidents or incidents in Canada
Victims of aviation accidents or incidents in 1941